Andaz is a 1971 Indian Bollywood romantic drama film, directed by Ramesh Sippy, and written by Salim–Javed, Gulzar and Sachin Bhowmick. It stars Shammi Kapoor, Hema Malini, Rajesh Khanna, and Simi Garewal.

The film was a considerable success and was important in the career of Malini as an actress. The film features "Zindagi Ek Safar Hai Suhana", one of the best known Bollywood yodels by the singer Kishore Kumar which also featured on the soundtrack of Mira Nair's Mississippi Masala. The song fetched singer Kishore Kumar a nomination for the Filmfare Award for Best Male Playback Singer. When this film released, films of Shammi Kapoor were not doing well at the box office. The 10-minute cameo of Rajesh Khanna is credited for turning Andaz (1971) Into A Super Hit Film. This film is counted among the 17 consecutive hit films of Rajesh Khanna between 1969 and 1971, by adding the two-hero films Marayada and Andaz to the 15 consecutive solo hits he gave from 1969 to 1971. Further, this film is the first of the successful script writing that Salim-Javed started.

Plot

This film tells the story of Sheetal (Hema Malini), a widow who is left devastated by the death of her husband Raj (Rajesh Khanna). She and her son are not accepted by her husband's family. She becomes a teacher to bring up her son by herself. One of her students is the daughter of widower Ravi (Shammi Kapoor). Ravi's beloved wife died in child birth. The children become instrumental in getting the single parents to meet and fall in love with each other.

Reception
Andaz was one of the last movies for which the great music directors duo, Shankar- Jaikishan composed music together. Jaikishan died of liver cirrhosis on 12 September 1971 at the young age of 42. "Zindagi Ek Safar Hai Suhana" (Life is a beautiful journey) turned out to be the last song that Jaikishan recorded before his death.

Andaz also proved to be the last hit for Shammi Kapoor as a lead. The success of this movie is credited to the Rajesh Khanna Mania of the 70s, as Rajesh Khanna only appeared for 15 minutes in the movie, and still created a stir. However, Shammi's performance was well received and it is considered to have been one of the most uncharacteristic roles in his acting career. So also, Ajit played a sympathetic man who repents for his mistake not to accept Hema Malini as his daughter-in-law after the death of his son Rajesh Khanna.

Cast
Shammi Kapoor as Ravi
Hema Malini as Sheetal
Rajesh Khanna as Raj
Simi Garewal as Mona
Ajit as Raj's dad
Aruna Irani as Mahua
Achala Sachdev as Ravi's mum
Roopesh Kumar as Ravi's stepbrother
David
Randhawa as Gangu
Baby Gauree as Munni (credits from the actual movie)
Master Alankar as Deepu (credits from the actual movie)

Soundtrack
The songs for the film were written by lyricists Gulzar and Hasrat Jaipuri.

Awards

 19th Filmfare Awards:

Won

 Best Lyricist – Hasrat Jaipuri for "Zindagi Ek Safar Hai Suhana"

Nominated

 Best Music Director – Shankar–Jaikishan
 Best Male Playback Singer – Kishore Kumar for "Zindagi Ek Safar Hai Suhana"
 Best Female Playback Singer – Asha Bhosle for "Zindagi Ek Safar Hai Suhana"

References

External links 
 

1971 films
1971 romantic drama films
1970s Hindi-language films
Indian romantic drama films
Films scored by Shankar–Jaikishan
Films directed by Ramesh Sippy
Films with screenplays by Salim–Javed
1970s Urdu-language films
1971 directorial debut films
Urdu-language Indian films